Antimony pentachloride is a chemical compound with the formula SbCl5. It is a colourless oil, but typical samples are yellowish due to dissolved chlorine. Owing to its tendency to hydrolyse to hydrochloric acid, SbCl5 is a highly corrosive substance and must be stored in glass or PTFE containers.

Preparation and structure
Antimony pentachloride is prepared by passing chlorine gas into molten antimony trichloride:
SbCl3 + Cl2 → SbCl5

Gaseous SbCl5 has a trigonal bipyramidal structure.

Reactions
This compounds reacts with water to form antimony pentoxide and hydrochloric acid:
2 SbCl5 + 5 H2O → Sb2O5 + 10 HCl

The mono- and tetrahydrates are known, SbCl5·H2O and SbCl5·4H2O.

This compound forms adducts with many Lewis bases. SbCl5 is a soft Lewis acid and its ECW model parameters are EA = 3.64 and CA = 10.42. It is used as the standard Lewis acid in the Gutmann scale of Lewis basicity.

It is also a strong oxidizing agent.  For example aromatic ethers are oxidized to their radical cations according to the following stoichiometry:
3SbCl5  +  2 ArH  →  2(ArH+)(SbCl6−)  +  SbCl3

Applications
Antimony pentachloride is used as a polymerization catalyst and for the chlorination of organic compounds.

Precautions
Antimony pentachloride is a highly corrosive substance that should be stored away from heat and moisture. It is a chlorinating agent and, in the presence of moisture, it releases hydrogen chloride gas. Because of this, it may etch even stainless-steel tools (such as needles), if handled in a moist atmosphere. It should not be handled with non-fluorinated plastics (such as plastic syringes, plastic septa, or needles with plastic fittings), since it melts and carbonizes plastic materials.

References

External links

Antimony(V) compounds
Chlorides
Metal halides
Oxidizing agents